Dewart  is a surname. Notable people with the surname include:

Edward Hartley Dewart (1828–1903), Irish-born Canadian Methodist clergyman, author and editor
Hartley Dewart (1861–1924), Canadian politicians
Leslie Dewart (1922–2009), Canadian philosopher 
Lewis Dewart (1780–1852), American politician
Murray Dewart (born 1947), American sculptor 
Sean Dewart, Canadian lawyer
William Lewis Dewart (1821–1888), American politician

See also
Dewart Lake, is a natural lake southwest of Syracuse in Kosciusko County, Indiana, United States
Dewart Island, is the central island in the Frazier Islands, in Vincennes Bay, Wilkes Land, East Antarctica
Dewart, Pennsylvania, is a census-designated place located in Delaware Township, Northumberland County in the state of Pennsylvania

References